is a Japanese actress and model of Japanese and Filipino ethnicity who has appeared in CanCam magazine and various television commercials.

Early and personal life 
Takahashi was born in Ōtsu, Shiga to a Filipino mother and a Japanese father. She has a younger sister, Yu Takahashi, who is also a model and actress, and a brother Yuji who is a footballer.

Career 
She began modeling in August 2003 after winning the "Yokohama Shonan Audition 2003" beauty contest, and professionally in April 2004 when she signed a contract with CanCam. Since 2007, she has appeared in various television shows such as music shows and variety shows, and various television commercials such as those for fashion brand Cecil McBee, Kyocera, Morinaga, and Google.

She has also been active in the runway scene, appearing in large collections such as Tokyo Girls Collection (2007 S/S, 2009 A/W, 2010 S/S, 2010 in Okinawa, 2010 A/W, 2011 in Nagoya, 2011 S/S, 2011 A/W, 2012 S/S) and Girls Award  (2010, 2010 A/W, 2011 A/W, 2012 S/S, 2012 A/W).

She quit exclusive modeling for CanCam in April 2012, and subsequently appeared in magazines such as Classy, Oggi, and Gina.

She has also appeared in the TV drama Jun to Ai with Mokomichi Hayami.

Takahashi portrayed Yumi Komagata in the film Rurouni Kenshin: Kyoto Inferno, released in 2014.

Appearances

TV dramas 
 Jun to Ai (NHK, 2012), Mariya Karino(Maruyama)
 Rich Man, Poor Woman (Fuji TV, 2013)
 Keishichō Sōsa Ikka 9 Gakari Season 8 Episode 2 (TV Asahi, 2013), Tomoyo Shinomiya
 Real Dasshutsu Game TV (TBS, 2014), Ageha
 Cabin Attendant Keiji: New York Satsujin Jiken (Fuji TV, 2014), Kei Shinoda
 Kōkaku Fudō Senki Robosan Episode 6 (TV Tokyo, 2014), Risa
 Zannen na Otto. (Fuji TV, 2015) Yui Sudō
 Jungle Fever (NHK BS Premium, 2016) Rieko Kikuchi
 Good Morning Call (Fuji TV, 2017) Kumanomido Saeko

 Jinsei-ga tanoshiku naru shiawase no housoku (“Happy rules to make life more enjoyable”)

Web dramas 
 Hibana (Netflix, 2016) Yurie

Films 
 Fashion Story: Model (2012)
 Ushijima the Loan Shark 2 (2014), Akane Saihara
 Rurouni Kenshin: Kyoto Inferno (2014), Yumi Komagata
 Rurouni Kenshin: The Legend Ends (2014), Yumi Komagata
 Kikaider Reboot (2014), Mari
 Heroine Shikkaku (2015), Emi
 Tag (a.k.a. Real Onigokko) (2015)
 All Esper Dayo! (2015)
 Fukushū Shitai (2016), Izumi Takahashi/Noriko Hoshino
 Shimauma (2016), Yui
 Haunted Campus (2016), Ai Mitamura
 Ushijima the Loan Shark 3 (2016), Akane Saihara
 Ushijima the Loan Shark The Final (2016), Akane Saihara
 L (2016), Anna
 Shinjuku Swan II (2017)
 The Blue Hearts (2017)
 Ai Ai Gasa (2018)
 What Happened to Our Nest Egg!? (2021)

Stage 
 Pu-Pu-Juice Kiseki no Otoko (2013)
 Pu-Pu-Juice Ryōma ga Ikiru, Ryōma o Korosu (2014)

Magazines 
 CanCam, Shogakukan 1982-, as an exclusive model from April 2004 to June 2012
 Classy, Kobunsha 1984-, as a regular model since June 2012

References

External links 
 
 Agency profile 

Japanese female models
1987 births
People from Ōtsu, Shiga
Japanese people of Filipino descent
Living people
Japanese television actresses
Japanese film actresses
21st-century Japanese actresses
Models from Shiga Prefecture